Tridrepana bifurcata is a moth in the family Drepanidae. It was described by X. Y. Chen in 1985. It is found in China in Hainan, Yunnan and Tibet.

Adults are similar to Tridrepana crocea, but can be distinguished by the browner ground colour.

References

Moths described in 1985
Drepaninae
Moths of Asia